In molecular biology, ZNRD1 antisense RNA 1 (non-protein coding), also known as ZNRD1-AS1 or HTEX4, is a long non-coding RNA. In humans, it is located in the MHC class I region of chromosome 6. It is expressed in testis and is alternatively spliced.

See also
 Long noncoding RNA

References

Further reading

Non-coding RNA